Santo is the surname of:

 Akiko Santō (born 1942), Japanese politician
 Anthony Santo (c. 1894–?), Italian-American murderer
 Audrey Santo (1983–2007), or Little Audrey, through whom miracles were said to have happened
 Damián de Santo, Argentine actor 
 Ron Santo (1940–2010), American baseball player and broadcaster
also
 George Santos, American politician, elected to Congress in 2022